Sylvester T. Everett (November 27, 1838 – January 13, 1922) was an American financier.

Life and career
Born in Liberty Township, Ohio, he worked on his father's farm until 1850.  Everett moved to Cleveland in 1851 to work, first as a messenger and later as a cashier, at Cleveland's oldest banking house, Brockway, Wason, Everett & Co (co-founded by his brother, Dr. Henry Everett).

Everett left Cleveland in 1858 to work at a bank in Philadelphia while helping settle the affairs of his uncle, Charles Everett. He returned to Cleveland a year later to his banking house position. In 1868, he became a member of Everett, Weddell & Co. (previously Brockway, Wason, Everett & Co.).

Everett served seven terms, from 1869 to 1888, as Treasurer of the city of Cleveland.  He was a prominent member of the Republican Party, being friends with President of the United States James Garfield who appointed Everett as U.S. government director of the Union Pacific Railroad.  Everett played a part in Marcus Hanna being elected an Ohio delegate to the 1884 Republican National Convention and himself served as an Ohio delegate at the 1872, 1880, 1888 and 1896 Republican National Conventions.

Everett's involvement with transportation led him to help finance and build some of the first U.S. electric streetcar systems in Akron, Ohio and Erie, Pennsylvania.  He served as Vice-President and Treasurer of the Valley Railway, completed in 1880, which ran between Cleveland and Akron.  A train depot and surrounding community on the railway were named Everett.
 
In 1876, he became president of Second National Bank, later reorganized as the Union National Bank.

Everett married his second wife Alice Wade, granddaughter of Jeptha Wade, in 1879 after the death of his first wife Mary in 1876. They commissioned Charles F. Schweinfurth to come to Cleveland from New York City to build the Romanesque style Sylvester Everett Mansion, started in 1883 and completed in 1887.
 
In 1883, he was asked to resign as President of Union National Bank by Henry B. Payne, at the request of the bank's directors. Everett had speculated in stocks, including the Northern Pacific Railway, with his own money, which was contrary to bank rules. He retained a financial interest in Everett, Weddell & Co. until 1883. It failed in 1884, amid later allegations by Horace Weddell that Everett and his brother had misrepresented the bank's solvency.

Bibliography
Burke, James Francis Official Proceedings of the Eleventh Republican National Convention University of California (1896). 
Croly, Herbert David Marcus Alonzo Hanna The Macmillan Company (1912). 
Reese, John S. Guide Book for the Tourist and Traveler Over the Valley Railway Kent State University Press. (2002).

External links
Sylvester T. Everett biography
New York Times News Article
New York Times News Article
New York Times News Article
New York Times News Article
New York Times News Article
New York Times News Article

1838 births
1922 deaths